My Lai is a documentary film created by PBS; it aired as an episode of American Experience.

Summary
The documentary details the 1968 My Lai Massacre and its background. Topics of the video include the men of Charlie Company and the cover-up of the event. Hugh Thompson Jr. (the rescue helicopter pilot who confronted the ground forces personally, reported the killings, and helped halt the massacre) is also covered in the documentary.

Accolades
My Lai was recognized as the 2010 Outstanding Directing For Nonfiction Programming during the Emmys. The documentary was also nominated as the 2010 Exceptional Merit In Nonfiction Filmmaking in the Emmys. The documentary was also awarded a 2010 Peabody Award.

References

2010 television films
2010 films
American documentary television films
Vietnam War films
American Experience
Films directed by Barak Goodman
2010s English-language films
Primetime Emmy Award-winning broadcasts